Ann-Sophie Qvarnström (born 26 July 1958) is a Swedish illustrator and silversmith best known for the maps she made for the Swedish role-playing ("RPG") community during the 1980s.

Biography
In 1984 she established the company Sophias Ateljé and opened a shop in Stockholm. About this time she came to the attentions of Äventyrsspel and Iron Crown Enterprises and during the following years she made many illustrated maps for their board games and role-playing games. In 1986 she made one of the first Swedish RPG maps in colour, the same year she co-wrote the town module Kandra together with her husband. After that she drew maps for many of the games by Äventyrsspel.

In 1993 she and her company moved to Visby, and she began to focus on jewellery design but she still did some props, patterns and garb for the Medieval Week on Gotland. In 2013 she was one of the winners in the Wiki Loves Monuments competition.

References

External links
 Sophies Silver
 Sophias Ateljés Förlag KB
 Allabolag.se

1958 births
Living people
People from Gothenburg
Swedish silversmiths
Swedish illustrators
Swedish women illustrators
Women metalsmiths
Swedish women artisans
Women jewellers